"Heartbeat (Tainai Kaiki II) – Returning to the Womb" is a collaboration between Ryuichi Sakamoto and David Sylvian, with music co-written by Arto Lindsay. It features vocals by Ingrid Chavez and spoken word by John Cage. The mini-album features a previous collaboration between Sakamoto and Sylvian, the 1984 re-recording of "Forbidden Colours", produced by Steve Nye, that was the B-side to Sylvian's single Red Guitar and features as a bonus track on his 1987 album Secrets of the Beehive.

Track listing

Charts

Release history

References

External links 
 

1992 songs
1992 singles
David Sylvian songs
Songs written by David Sylvian
Songs written by Ryuichi Sakamoto